Travno is an urban settlement of the Croatian capital of Zagreb, located in a city district of Novi Zagreb – istok.

It is one of the most densely populated settlements in Croatia mostly due to the largest apartment building in Croatia: Mamutica.

The Gustav Krklec elementary school and a large green area (Travno Park) are located in the center of the settlement. There are two major streets - Božidar Magovac (former Victor Bubanj Alley) and Nikola Kopernik, and three kindergartens. Also, it has the Catholic Church of Sv. Luke the Evangelist.

The Travno Cultural Center and the City Library - Novi Zagreb are located in Travno.

Gallery

References

External links
 

Neighbourhoods of Zagreb
Novi Zagreb